is a Buddhist temple belonging to the Shingon-shū Chizan-ha sect located in the city of Sakai, Fukui, Japan in the Hokuriku region of Japan. Its main image is a statue of Yakushi Nyōrai, which the temple claims was carved by the Nara period shugendō monk Taichō. The temple is noted for its Japanese garden.

History
Takidan-ji was founded in 1377 AD and moved to its present location in 1381. During the Muromachi period it was patronized by the Asakura clan and during the Sengoku period by Shibata Katsuie. Under the Edo period Tokugawa shogunate, it was patronized by the Matsudaira clan, daimyō of Fukui Domain and had many sub-temples. Following the Meiji restoration, the temple became much reduced in scale. Many of its surviving structures date from the Edo period.

Cultural properties
 Hondō, built in 1688, National Important Cultural Property.
 Sanmon, built in 1698, National Important Cultural Property.
 Kannon-dō, built in the Muromachi period, reconstructed in 1663, National Important Cultural Property.
 Kuri, reconstructed in 1688, National Important Cultural Property
 Chinju-dō, built in the Edo period, National Important Cultural Property.
 Kaisan-dō, built in the Edo period, National Important Cultural Property.
 Kyakuden-dō, built in 1914, Fukui Prefectural Important Cultural Property

Bianqing Gilt bronze Buddhist ritual gong with hōsōge flower design, late Heian period, National Treasure
Jizō, Bosatsu Scroll, late Heian period, National Important Cultural Property.
"Map of the Heavens" Scroll, Muromachi period, National Important Cultural Property.

 Japanese garden adjacent to the Main Hall was designated one of the National Places of Scenic Beauty of Japan in 1967.

See also
List of Places of Scenic Beauty of Japan (Fukui)

References

External links

Sakai city tourism site 
Takidan-ji Official Site 
Sakai City Official Website

Buddhist temples in Fukui Prefecture
Sakai, Fukui
Shingon temples
1370s establishments in Japan
Echizen Province
Places of Scenic Beauty